This page lists notable table tennis events taking place in 2017, including the 2017 World Table Tennis Championships and the 2017 ITTF World Tour.

World table tennis championships

Senior

 May 29 – June 5: 2017 World Table Tennis Championships in  Düsseldorf
{| 
|-
|rowspan=2|Men's singles
|rowspan=2| Ma Long
|rowspan=2| Fan Zhendong
| Xu Xin
|-
| Lee Sang-su
|-
|rowspan=2|Women's singles
|rowspan=2| Ding Ning
|rowspan=2| Zhu Yuling
| Miu Hirano
|-
| Liu Shiwen
|-
|rowspan=2|Men's doubles
|rowspan=2| Fan Zhendong Xu Xin
|rowspan=2| Masataka Morizono Yuya Oshima
| Jung Young-sik Lee Sang-su 
|-
| Koki Niwa Maharu Yoshimura
|-
|rowspan=2|Women's doubles
|rowspan=2| Ding Ning Liu Shiwen
|rowspan=2| Chen Meng Zhu Yuling
| Feng Tianwei Yu Mengyu
|-
| Hina Hayata Mima Ito
|-
|rowspan=2|Mixed doubles
|rowspan=2| Maharu Yoshimura Kasumi Ishikawa 
|rowspan=2| Chen Chien-an Cheng I-ching 
| Fang Bo Petrissa Solja
|-
| Wong Chun Ting Doo Hoi Kem
|}
 October 20–22: 2017 ITTF Men's World Cup in  Liège
   Dimitrij Ovtcharov
   Timo Boll
   Ma Long
 October 27–29: 2017 ITTF Women's World Cup in  Markham
   Zhu Yuling
   Liu Shiwen
   Cheng I-ching

Junior and cadet

 October 21–29: 2017 World Cadet Challenge in  Suva
 Cadet boys' singles:  NIU Guankai
 Cadet girls' singles:  Yumeno Soma
 Cadet boys' doubles:  FENG Yi-Hsin &  NIU Guankai
 Cadet girls' doubles:  HUANG Yingqi &  Yumeno Soma
 Cadet mixed doubles:  NIU Guankai &  Jamila Laurenti
 November 26 – December 3: 2017 World Junior Table Tennis Championships in  Riva del Garda
 Junior boys' singles:  XUE Fei
 Junior girls' singles:  SUN Yingsha
 Junior boys' doubles:  XUE Fei & WANG Chuqin
 Junior girls' doubles:  SHI Xunyao & SUN Yingsha
 Junior mixed doubles:  XUE Fei & Wang Manyu

Para TT

 May 17–20: 2017 Para Table Tennis World Team Championships in  Bratislava
 For results, click here for this event's results book page.

Continental table tennis championships

Africa

 April 9–15: 2017 African Junior & Cadet Table Tennis Championships in  Tunis

 Junior boys' singles:  Youssef Abdel-Aziz
 Junior girls' singles:  Marwa Alhodaby
 Junior boys' doubles:  Youssef Abdel-Aziz & Karim Elhakem
 Junior girls' doubles:  Mariam Alhodaby & Marwa Alhodaby
 Junior mixed doubles:  Youssef Abdel-Aziz & Marwa Alhodaby
 Junior boys' teams:  Youssef Abdel-Aziz, Karim Elhakem, & Ahmed Elborhamy
 Junior girls' teams:  Marwa Alhodaby, Sarah Abousetta, & Mariam Alhodaby

 Cadet boys' singles:  Mohamed Azzam
 Cadet girls' singles:  Fadwa Garci
 Cadet boys' teams:  Mohamed Azzam & Youssef Ehab
 Cadet girls' teams:  Sara Elhakem & Hana Mahmoud

 July 1–3: 2017 African Cup in  Agadir
 Men's singles:  Quadri Aruna
 Women's singles:  Dina Meshref

Americas

Senior

 July 28–30: 2017 Pan American Cup in  San José
 Men's singles:  Gustavo Tsuboi
 Women's singles:  Lily Zhang
 September 11–17: 2017 Pan American Table Tennis Championships in  Cartagena
 Men's singles:  Hugo Calderano
 Women's singles:  Adriana Díaz
 Men's doubles:  Vitor Ishiy & Eric Jouti
 Women's doubles:  Alicia Cote & Zhang Mo
 Mixed doubles:  Vitor Ishiy & Bruna Takahashi
 Men's team:  (Eric Jouti, Thiago Monteiro, & Vitor Ishiy)
 Women's team:  (Bruna Takahashi, Lin Gui, & Bruna Alexandre)

Junior and cadet

 February 8–11: 2017 Central American Junior & Cadet Championships in  Guatemala City

 Junior boys' singles:  Diego Fuentes
 Junior girls' singles:  Lucía Cordero
 Junior boys' doubles:  Diego Fuentes & George Wang
 Junior girls' doubles:  Lucía Cordero & Hidalynn Zapata
 Junior mixed doubles:  Noe Sánchez & Lucía Cordero
 Junior boys' team: 
 Junior girls' team: 

 Cadet boys' singles:  Darío Arce
 Cadet girls' singles:  Clío Bárcenas
 Cadet boys' doubles:  Darío Arce & Adrián Castillo
 Cadet girls' doubles:  Mabella Aceves & Clío Bárcenas
 Cadet mixed doubles:  Darío Arce & Clío Bárcenas
 Cadet boys' team: 
 Cadet girls' team: 

 March 18–22: 2017 South American Junior & Cadet Championships in  Asunción

 Junior boys' singles:  Nicolás Burgos
 Junior girls' singles:  Nathaly Paredes
 Junior boys' doubles:  Siddharta Almeida & Luiz Anjos
 Junior girls' doubles:  Alexia Nakashima & Luana Souza
 Junior mixed doubles:  Siddharta Almeida & Alexia Nakashima
 Junior boys' team: 
 Junior girls' team: 

 Cadet boys' singles:  Diogo Silva
 Cadet girls' singles:  Livia Lima
 Cadet boys' doubles:  Daniel Godoi & Diogo Silva
 Cadet girls' doubles:  Livia Lima & Giulia Takahashi
 Cadet mixed doubles:  Daniel Godoi & Livia Lima
 Cadet boys' team: 
 Cadet girls' team: 

 June 20–25: 2017 Pan American Junior Table Tennis Championships in  Buenos Aires

 Junior boys' singles:  Kanak Jha
 Junior girls' singles:  Bruna Takahashi
 Junior boys' doubles:  Sharon Alguetti & Kanak Jha
 Junior girls' doubles:  Alexia Nakashima & Bruna Takahashi
 Junior mixed doubles:  Siddharta Almeida & Bruna Takahashi

 Junior boys' team: 
 Junior girls' team:

Para TT

 November 28 – December 4: 2017 Para TT Americas Championships in  San José

Asia

Senior

 April 9–16: 2017 Asian Table Tennis Championships in  Wuxi
 Men's singles:  Fan Zhendong
 Women's singles:  Miu Hirano
 Men's doubles:  Fan Zhendong & Lin Gaoyuan
 Women's doubles:  Chen Meng & Zhu Yuling
 Mixed doubles:  Zhou Yu & Chen Xingtong
 Men's team: 
 Women's team: 
 September 15–17: 2017 Asian Cup in  Ahmedabad
 Men's singles:  Lin Gaoyuan
 Women's singles:  Zhu Yuling

Junior and cadet

 June 29 – July 4: 2017 Asian Junior & Cadet Table Tennis Championships in  Asan

 Junior boys' singles:  WANG Chuqin
 Junior girls' singles:  SUN Yingsha
 Junior boys' doubles:  AN Jae-hyun & HWANG Min-ha
 Junior girls' doubles:  SUN Yingsha & QIAN Tianyi
 Junior mixed doubles:  WANG Chuqin & SUN Yingsha
 Junior boys' team:  (WANG Chuqin, XUE Fei, & XU Yingbin)
 Junior girls' team:  (SUN Yingsha, SHI Xunyao, & QIAN Tianyi)

 Cadet boys' singles:  NIU Guankai
 Cadet girls' singles:  Yumeno Soma
 Cadet boys' team:  (NIU Guankai, YU Zhengyang, & SONG Zhuoheng)
 Cadet girls' team:  (WANG Tianyi, HUANG Yingqi, & KUAI Man)

Para TT

 August 23–31: Para TT Asian Championships in  Beijing
  won both the gold and overall medal tallies.

Europe

Senior

 February 3–5: 2017 Europe Top-16 in  Antibes
 Men:   Dimitrij Ovtcharov;   Alexander Shibaev;   Simon Gauzy
 Women:   Li Jie;   Petrissa Solja;   Sabine Winter
 June 26 – July 1: 2017 European Veterans Championships in  Helsingborg
 For results, click here.
 September 13–17: 2017 European Team Table Tennis Championships in  Luxembourg City
 Men:  ;  ;   & 
 Women:  ;  ;   &

U-21, Junior and cadet

 February 2–5: 2017 European Under-21 Table Tennis Championships in  Sochi (debut event)
 Men's singles:  Tomislav Pucar
 Women's singles:  Chantal Mantz
 Men's doubles:  Anders Lind &  Alexander Valuch
 Women's doubles:  Eline Loyen & Lisa Lung
 July 14–23: 2017 European Youth Table Tennis Championships in  Guimarães
 Men's singles:  Ioannis Sgouropoulos
 Women's singles:  Ning Jing
 Men's doubles:  Cristian Pletea &  Denis Ivonin
 Women's doubles:  Maria Yovkova &  Fanni Harasztovich
 Mixed doubles:  Jules Rolland & Lucie Gauthier
 teams:  (m) /  (f)
 September 8–10: 2017 Europe Youth Top-10 in  Worcester
 Junior boys' winner:  Cristian Pletea 
 Junior girls' winner:  Adina Diaconu
 Cadet boys' winner:  Samuel Kulczycki
 Cadet girls' winner:  Sophia Klee

Para TT

 September 26 – October 5: 2017 Para TT European Championships in  Laško
  won the gold medal tally.  and  won 12 overall medals each.

Oceania

 April 13–16: 2017 Oceania Junior Table Tennis Championships in  Suva

 Junior boys' singles:  Dean Shu
 Junior girls' singles:  Holly Nicolas
 Junior boys' doubles:  Victor Ma & Roger Wang
 Junior girls' doubles:  Matilda Alexandersson & Holly Nicolas
 Junior mixed doubles:  Rohan Dhooria & Holly Nicolas
 Junior boys' team: 
 Junior girls' team: 

 Cadet boys' singles:  Finn Luu
 Cadet girls' singles:  Jiayi Zhou
 Cadet boys' doubles:  Noah Kim & Finn Luu
 Cadet girls' doubles:  Sue Bin Oh & Cindy Suy
 Cadet mixed doubles:  Finn Luu & Cindy Suy
 Cadet boys' team: 
 Cadet girls' team: 

 April 13–16: 2017 Oceania Para Table Tennis Championships in  Suva

 Men's singles (Class 2–3):  Chen Junjian
 Men's singles (Class 4–5):  Caleb Benjamin Crowden
 Men's singles (Class 6–7):  Trevor Hirth
 Men's singles (Class 8–9):  Nathan Pellissier
 Men's Team (Class 2–5):  Chen Junjian, Steven Michael Gow, & Caleb Benjamin Crowden

 Women's singles (Class 2–5):  Merewalesi Vakacegu Roden
 Women's singles (Class 6–8):  Rebecca Anne Julian

April 15–16: 2017 ITTF-Oceania Cup in  Suva
 Men:   David Powell;   Kane Townsend;   Yoshua Shing
 Women:   Jian Fang Lay;   Melissa Tapper;   Solenn Danger

2017 ITTF World Tour

World Tour Platinum events
 February 21–26: Qatar Open in  Doha
 Men's singles:  Ma Long
 Women's singles:  Chen Meng
 Men's doubles:  Masataka Morizono & Yuya Oshima
 Women's doubles:  Chen Meng & Wang Manyu
 Under-21 Men's singles:  Lam Siu Hang
 Under-21 Women's singles:  Doo Hoi Kem
June 14–18: Japan Open in  Tokyo
 Men's singles:  Ma Long
 Women's singles:  Sun Yingsha
 Men's doubles:  Ma Long & Xu Xin
 Women's doubles:  Chen Xingtong & Sun Yingsha
 Under-21 Men's singles:  Lim Jong-hoon
 Under-21 Women's singles:  Yuka Umemura
June 20–25: China Open in  Chengdu
 Men's singles:  Dimitrij Ovtcharov
 Women's singles:  Ding Ning
 Men's doubles:  Jin Ueda & Maharu Yoshimura
 Women's doubles:  Ding Ning & Liu Shiwen
 Under-21 Men's singles:  Yuto Kizukuri
 Under-21 Women's singles:  Maki Shiomi
July 2–7: Australian Open in  Brisbane
 Men's singles:  Vladimir Samsonov
 Women's singles:  Chen Meng
 Men's doubles:  JANG Woo-jin & PARK Gang-hyeon
 Women's doubles:  Chen Meng & Zhu Yuling
 Under-21 Men's singles:  PARK Gang-hyeon
 Under-21 Women's singles:  Saki Shibata
September 19–24: Austrian Open in  Linz
 Men's singles:  LIN Gaoyuan
 Women's singles:  Wang Manyu
 Men's doubles:  Koki Niwa & Jin Ueda
 Women's doubles:  CHEN Xingtong & SUN Yingsha
 Under-21 Men's singles:  XUE Fei
 Under-21 Women's singles:  Zhang Rui
November 7–12: German Open in  Magdeburg
 Men's singles:  Dimitrij Ovtcharov
 Women's singles:  Chen Meng
 Men's doubles:  Jung Young-sik & Lee Sang-su
 Women's doubles:  Hina Hayata & Miu Hirano
 Under-21 Men's singles:  XUE Fei
 Under-21 Women's singles:  CHEN Ke

World Tour events
 January 17–22: Hungarian Open in  Budapest
 Men's singles:  Yan An
 Women's singles:  Chen Xingtong
 Men's doubles:  Fang Bo & Zhou Yu
 Women's doubles:  Chen Xingtong & Li Jiayi
 Under-21 Men's singles:  Kirill Gerassimenko
 Under-21 Women's singles:  Zeng Jian
 February 14–19: India Open in  New Delhi
 Men's singles:  Dimitrij Ovtcharov
 Women's singles:  Sakura Mori
 Men's doubles:  Masataka Morizono & Yuya Oshima
 Women's doubles:  Matilda Ekholm &  Georgina Póta
 Under-21 Men's singles:  Asuka Sakai
 Under-21 Women's singles:  Sakura Mori
 April 18–23: Korea Open in  Incheon
 Men's singles:  Timo Boll
 Women's singles:  Feng Tianwei
 Men's doubles:  Jang Woo-jin & Jeong Sang-eun
 Women's doubles:  Shan Xiaona & Petrissa Solja
 Under-21 Men's singles:  Lim Jong-hoon
 Under-21 Women's singles:  Minami Ando
 August 15–20: Bulgaria Open in  Panagyurishte
 Men's singles:  Dimitrij Ovtcharov
 Women's singles:  Kasumi Ishikawa
 Men's doubles:  Jin Ueda & Maharu Yoshimura
 Women's doubles:  Kasumi Ishikawa & Mima Ito
 Under-21 Men's singles:  Mizuki Oikawa
 Under-21 Women's singles:  Mizuki Morizono
 August 22–27: Czech Open in  Olomouc
 Men's singles:  Tomokazu Harimoto
 Women's singles:  Mima Ito
 Men's doubles:  Patrick Franziska &  Jonathan Groth
 Women's doubles:  Hina Hayata & Mima Ito
 Under-21 Men's singles:  Can Akkuzu
 Under-21 Women's singles:  Adriana Díaz
 November 13–19: Swedish Open in  Stockholm
 Men's singles:  Xu Xin
 Women's singles:  CHEN Xingtong
 Men's doubles:  Fan Zhendong & Xu Xin
 Women's doubles:  Hina Hayata & Mima Ito
 Under-21 Men's singles:  PARK Gang-hyeon
 Under-21 Women's singles:  Zhang Rui

Grand Finals
 December 14–17: 2017 ITTF World Tour Grand Finals in  Astana
 Men's singles:  Fan Zhendong
 Women's singles:  Chen Meng
 Men's doubles:  Masataka Morizono & Yuya Oshima
 Women's doubles:  Chen Meng & Zhu Yuling

2017 ITTF Challenge Series

 March 15–19: Belarus Open in  Minsk
 Men's singles:  Vladimir Samsonov
 Women's singles:  Hitomi Sato
 Men's doubles:  Daniel Górak & Wang Zengyi
 Women's doubles:  Miyu Kato & Misaki Morizono
 Under-21 Men's singles:  Cristian Pletea
 Under-21 Women's singles:  Saki Shibata
 March 29 – April 2: Thailand Open in  Bangkok
 Men's singles:  Jin Ueda
 Women's singles:  Hitomi Sato
 Men's doubles:  Kenji Matsudaira & Jin Ueda
 Women's doubles:  Honoka Hashimoto & Hitomi Sato
 Under-21 Men's singles:  Yuma Tsuboi
 Under-21 Women's singles:  Saki Shibata
April 26–30: Chile Open in  Santiago
 Men's singles:  Soumyajit Ghosh
 Women's singles:  Caroline Kumahara
 Men's doubles:  Amalraj Anthony & Soumyajit Ghosh
 Women's doubles:  Ana Codina & Candela Molero
 Under-21 Men's singles:  Horacio Cifuentes
 Under-21 Women's singles:  Valentina Rios
April 26–30: Slovenia Open in  Otočec
 Men's singles:  Bastian Steger
 Women's singles:  Hitomi Sato
 Men's doubles:  Choi Won-jin & Lee Jung-woo
 Women's doubles:  Matilda Ekholm &  Georgina Pota
 Under-21 Men's singles:  Yuki Matsuyama
 Under-21 Women's singles:  Adriana Diaz
May 2–6: Croatia Open in  Zagreb
 Men's singles:  Panagiotis Gionis
 Women's singles:  Honoka Hashimoto
 Men's doubles:  Viktor Brodd & Hampus Nordberg
 Women's doubles:  Honoka Hashimoto & Hitomi Sato
 Under-21 Men's singles:  Koyo Kanamitsu
 Under-21 Women's singles:  Adina Diaconu
May 3–7: Brazil Open in  São Paulo
 Men's singles:  Hugo Calderano
 Women's singles:  Bernadette Szőcs
 Men's doubles:  Hugo Calderano & Gustavo Tsuboi
 Women's doubles:  Bernadette Szőcs &  Audrey Zarif
 Under-21 Men's singles:  Andrea Landrieu
 Under-21 Women's singles:  Bruna Takahashi
August 2–6: Pyongyang Open in  Pyongyang
 Men's singles:  PAK Sin Hyok
 Women's singles:  Kim Song-i
 Men's doubles:  CHOE Il & PAK Sin Hyok
 Women's doubles:  CHOE Hyon Hwa & KIM Song I
 Under-21 Men's singles:  KIM Ok Chan
 Under-21 Women's singles:  RI Hyon Sim
August 9–13: Nigeria Open in  Lagos
 Men's singles:  Omar Assar
 Women's singles:  Dina Meshref
 Men's doubles:  Antoine Hachard & Gregoire Jean
 Women's doubles:  Bernadett Balint & Szandra Pergel
 Under-21 Men's singles:  Youssef Abdel-Aziz
 Under-21 Women's singles:  Giorgia Piccolin
October 4–8: Polish Open in  Warsaw
 Men's singles:  Quadri Aruna
 Women's singles:  Mima Ito
 Men's doubles:  Ho Kwan Kit & NG Pak Nam
 Women's doubles:  Doo Hoi Kem & Lee Ho Ching
 Under-21 Men's singles:  Mizuki Oikawa
 Under-21 Women's singles:  Nina Mittelham
October 31 – November 4: Belgium Open in  De Haan
 Men's singles:  KIM Dong-hyun
 Women's singles:  Saki Shibata
 Men's doubles:  Patrick Franziska & Ricardo Walther
 Women's doubles:  Honoka Hashimoto & Hitomi Satō
 Under-21 Men's singles:  Shunsuke Togami
 Under-21 Women's singles:  LI Yu-Jhun
November 22–26: Spanish Open in  Almería
 Men's singles:  Sathiyan Gnanasekaran
 Women's singles:  Hina Hayata
 Men's doubles:  CHO Seung-min & PARK Gang-hyeon
 Women's doubles:  Jeon Ji-hee & Yang Ha-eun
 Under-21 Men's singles:  LAM Siu Hang
 Under-21 Women's singles:  Satsuki Odo

2017 ITTF World Junior Circuit

Golden Series events

May 10–14: Thailand Junior & Cadet Open in  Bangkok

 Junior boys' singles:  Fumiya Igarashi
 Junior girls' singles:  Kasumi Kimura
 Cadet boys' singles:  Maurice Kai Ning Chong
 Cadet girls' singles:  HUANG Yu-Jie

 Junior boys' team:  (Seiya Numamura, Fumiya Igarashi, & Ryu Hiruta)
 Junior girls' team:  (Kasumi Kimura, Asuka Sasao & Ayano I)
 Cadet boys' team:  (Chan Yee Shun, Maurice Kai Ning Chong, & Wong Hon Lam)
 Cadet girls' team:  (Chau Wing Sze, Lee Ka Yee, & Poon Yat)

May 24–28: Polish Junior & Cadet Open in  Władysławowo

 Junior boys' team:  (Shunsuke Togami, Jo Yokotani, & Kakeru Sone)
 Junior girls' team:  (Adina Diaconu, Andreea Dragoman, & Tania Plaian)

 Cadet boys' singles:  Kakeru Sone
 Cadet girls' singles:  Satsuki Odo
 Cadet boys' doubles:  Csaba Andras &  Martin Friis
 Cadet girls' doubles:  Elizabet Abraamian & Ekaterina Zironova
 Cadet boys' team:  
 Cadet girls' team: 

June 21–25: China Junior & Cadet Open in  Taicang

 Junior boys' singles:  WANG Chuqin
 Junior girls' singles:  QIAN Tianyi

 Cadet boys' singles:  NIU Guankai
 Cadet girls' singles:  HUANG Yingqi
 Cadet boys' team:  SONG Zhuoheng & NIU Guankai
 Cadet girls' team:  WANG Tianyi, KUAI Man, & HUANG Yingqi

August 2–6: Hong Kong Junior & Cadet Open in  Hong Kong

 Junior boys' singles:  YANG Shuo
 Junior girls' singles:  LIU Weishan
 Junior boys' doubles:  LI Hsin-Yang & LIN Yun-Ju
 Junior girls' doubles:  Miyuu Kihara / Miyu Nagasaki
 Junior boys' team:  XU Haidong, XU Yingbin, & YANG Shuo
 Junior girls' team:  QIAN Tianyi, SHI Xunyao, & LIU Weishan

 Cadet boys' singles:  LI Tiago
 Cadet girls' singles:  Haruna Ojio
 Cadet boys' doubles:  Baldwin Ho Wah Chan / CHAN Yee Shun
 Cadet girls' doubles:  Satsuki Odo / Yukari Sugasawa
 Cadet boys' team:  Michael Minh Tran & Nikhil Kumar
 Cadet girls' team:  NG Wing Lam & LEE Ka Yee

Premium events

February 8–12: Czech Junior & Cadet Open in  Hodonín

 Junior boys' singles:  Yang Xinyu
 Junior girls' singles:  Maki Shiomi
 Junior boys' doubles:  Artur Grela & Kamil Nalepa
 Junior girls' doubles:  Miyu Nagasaki & Maki Shiomi

 Cadet boys' singles:  Hiroto Shinozuka
 Cadet girls' singles:  Byun Seoyoung
 Cadet boys' doubles:  František Onderka & Radek Skála
 Cadet girls' doubles:  Byun Seoyoung & Jung Dabin

February 15–19: French Junior & Cadet Open in  Metz

 Junior boys' singles:  Bastien Rembert
 Junior girls' singles:  Ning Jing
 Junior boys' doubles:  Lilian Bardet & Irvin Bertrand
 Junior girls' doubles:  Miyu Nagasaki & Maki Shiomi

 Cadet boys' singles:  Jo Yokotani
 Cadet girls' singles:  Satsuki Odo
 Cadet boys' doubles:  Maciej Kubik & Samuel Kulczycki
 Cadet girls' doubles:  Chau Wing Sze & Lee Ka Yee

March 8–12: Italian Junior & Cadet Open in  Lignano

 Junior boys' singles:  Maciej Kołodziejczyk
 Junior girls' singles:  Jennie Wolf
 Junior boys' doubles:  Antonino Amato & Daniele Pinto
 Junior girls' doubles:  Izabela Lupulesku & Sabina Šurjan

 Cadet boys' singles:  Csaba András
 Cadet girls' singles:  Rachel Sung
 Cadet boys' doubles:  Matteo Gualdi & John Oyebode
 Cadet girls' doubles:  Cloe Chomis & Lou Frété

September 13–17: Croatia Junior & Cadet Open in  Varaždin

 Junior boys' singles:  Kanak Jha
 Junior girls' singles:  SUN Jiayi
 Junior boys' doubles:  FENG Yi-Hsin & TAI Ming-Wei
 Junior girls' doubles:  SUN Jiayi &  Sabina Šurjan

 Cadet boys' singles:  YANG Ye-chan
 Cadet girls' singles:  Yukari Sugasawa
 Cadet boys' doubles:  KIM Mun-su & KIM Tae-hyun
 Cadet girls' doubles:  Satsuki Odo & Yukari Sugasawa

October 28 – November 1: India Junior & Cadet Open in  Greater Noida

 Junior boys' singles:  Manav Vikash Thakkar
 Junior girls' singles:  Maki Shiomi
 Junior boys' doubles:  Manush Utpalbhai Shah & Manav Vikash Thakkar
 Junior girls' doubles:  LEE Da-gyeong & LEE Seung-mi

 Cadet boys' singles:  PANG Yew En
 Cadet girls' singles:  LEE Da-gyeong

November 8–12: Hungary Junior & Cadet Open in  Szombathely

 Junior boys' singles:  Rares Sipos
 Junior girls' singles:  Sabina Šurjan
 Junior boys' doubles:  Cristian Chirita & Rares Sipos
 Junior girls' doubles:  Izabela Lupulesku & Sabina Šurjan

 Cadet boys' singles:  LI Hsin-Yu
 Cadet girls' singles:  Elizabet Abraamian
 Cadet boys' doubles:  LI Hsin-Yu & PENG Chih
 Cadet girls' doubles:  CHIEN Tung-Chuan & HUANG Yu-Jie

Regular events

February 22–26: Swedish Junior & Cadet Open in  Örebro

 Junior boys' singles:  Shunsuke Togami
 Junior girls' singles:  Maki Shiomi
 Junior boys' doubles:  Kazuki Hamada & Shunsuke Togami
 Junior girls' doubles:  Maki Shiomi &  Wong Chin Yau

 Cadet boys' singles:  Dorian Zheng
 Cadet girls' singles:  Lee Ka Yee

March 23–26: Paraguay Junior & Cadet Open in  Asunción

 Junior boys' singles:  Carlos Ishida
 Junior girls' singles:  Beatriz Kimoto

 Cadet boys' singles:  Kenzo Carmo
 Cadet girls' singles:  Valentina Ríos

April 3–7: Tunisia Junior & Cadet Open in  Radès

 Junior boys' singles:  Cristian Pletea
 Junior girls' singles:  Adina Diaconu
 Junior boys' doubles:  Cristian Pletea & Rares Sipos
 Junior girls' doubles:  Adina Diaconu & Andreea Dragoman

 Cadet boys' singles:  John Oyebode
 Cadet girls' singles:  Fadwa Garci

April 8–11: Australian Junior & Cadet Open in  Tweed Heads

 Junior boys' singles:  Naoya Kawakami
 Junior girls' singles: 
 Junior boys' doubles:  Naoya Kawakami & Shunsuke Tsukidate
 Junior girls' doubles:  Parleen Kaur & Danni-Elle Townsend

 Cadet boys' singles:  Nathan Xu
 Cadet girls' singles:  Lavanya Maruthapandian
 Cadet boys' doubles:  Noah Kim & Finn Luu
 Cadet girls' doubles:  Sue Bin Oh & Cindy Suy

April 19–23: Belgium Junior & Cadet Open in  Spa

 Junior boys' singles:  Lilian Bardet
 Junior girls' singles:  Lisa Lung
 Junior boys' doubles:  Lilian Bardet & Bastien Rembert
 Junior girls' doubles:  Lisa Lung &  Amy Wang

 Cadet boys' singles:  Olav Kosolosky
 Cadet girls' singles:  Amy Wang
 Cadet boys' doubles:  Owen Cathcart &  Borgar Haug
 Cadet girls' doubles:  Monsawan Saritapirak &  Amy Wang

May 17–21: Spanish Junior & Cadet Open in  Platja d'Aro

 Junior boys' singles:  Artur Abusev
 Junior girls' singles:  Maki Shiomi
 Junior boys' doubles:  FENG Yi-Hsin, LI Hsin-Yang, & TAI Ming-Wei
 Junior girls' doubles:  Yuka Minagawa, Yumeno Soma, & Satsuki Odo

 Cadet boys' singles:  FENG Yi-Hsin
 Cadet girls' singles:  Yumeno Soma
 Cadet boys' doubles:  Vladislav Makarov & Maksim Grebnev
 Cadet girls' doubles:  Ekaterina Zironova & Elizabet Abraamian

June 1–4: Slovak Junior Open in  Senec
 Junior boys' singles:  Luke Savill
 Junior girls' singles:  SU Pei-Ling
 Junior boys' doubles:  Patrik Juhasz & Istvan Molnar
 Junior girls' doubles:  CHEN Ting-Ting & SU Pei-Ling
June 18–19: Argentina Junior Open in  Buenos Aires
 Junior boys' singles:  Kanak Jha
 Junior girls' singles:  Amy Wang
July 25–29: Jordan Junior & Cadet Open in  Amman

 Junior boys' singles:  Snehit Suravajjula
 Junior girls' singles:  Yashini Sivasankar
 Junior boys' doubles:  Manush Utpalbhai Shah & Parth Virmani
 Junior girls' doubles:  Nanapat Kola & Jinnipa Sawettabut

 Cadet boys' singles:  HSU Po-Hsuan
 Cadet girls' singles:  HUANG Yu-Jie
 Cadet boys' doubles:  HSU Po-Hsuan & PENG Chih
 Cadet girls' doubles:  CHEN Ci-Xuan & HUANG Yu-Jie

August 16–20: El Salvador Junior & Cadet Open in  San Salvador

 Junior boys' singles:  Jacobo Vahnish
 Junior girls' singles:  Ishana Deb
 Junior boys' doubles:  Oskar Danielsson & Oskar Hedlund
 Junior girls' doubles:  Paula Acevedo & Lucia Cordero

 Cadet boys' singles:  Jacobo Vahnish
 Cadet girls' singles:  Fabiola Diaz
 Mini Cadet boys' singles:  Angel Naranjo
 Mini Cadet girls' singles:  Sarika Ahire
 Cadet boys' doubles:  Angel Naranjo & Jabdiel Torres
 Cadet girls' doubles:  Fabiola Diaz & Kassandra Maldonado

September 20–24: Slovenia Junior & Cadet Open in  Otočec

 Junior boys' singles:  Manav Vikash Thakkar
 Junior girls' singles:  SUN Jiayi
 Junior boys' doubles:  Manush Utpalbhai Shah & Manav Vikash Thakkar
 Junior girls' doubles:  Satsuki Odo & Yukari Sugasawa

 Cadet boys' singles:  Owen Cathcart
 Cadet girls' singles:  Elena Zaharia

October 4–8: Serbia Junior & Cadet Open in  Vrnjačka Banja

 Junior boys' singles:  Sharon Alguetti
 Junior girls' singles:  Sabina Šurjan
 Junior boys' doubles:  Jeremy Hazin &  Paul Mladin
 Junior girls' doubles:  Tijana Jokić & Sabina Šurjan

 Cadet boys' singles:  Owen Cathcart
 Cadet girls' singles:  Radmila Tominjak
 Cadet boys' doubles:  Ivor Ban & Filip Borovnjak
 Cadet girls' doubles:  Reka Bezeg & Radmila Tominjak

October 11–15: Egypt Junior & Cadet Open in  Sharm El Sheikh

 Junior boys' singles:  Denis Ivonin
 Junior girls' singles:  Selena Selvakumar
 Junior boys' doubles:  Remi Menand & Bastien Rembert
 Junior girls' doubles:  Esther Oribamise &  Selena Selvakumar

 Cadet boys' singles:  Taiwo Mati
 Cadet girls' singles:  Farida Badawy
 Cadet boys' doubles:  Mohamed Azzam &  Youssef Ben Attia
 Cadet girls' doubles:  Fadwa Garci &  Hana Mahmoud

November 3–5: Slovak Cadet Open in  Bratislava
 Cadet boys' singles:  Maciej Kubik
 Cadet girls' singles:  Naomi Pranjkovic
 Cadet boys' doubles:  Ivor Ban & Filip Borovnjak
 Cadet girls' doubles:  Ana Cristina Barbu & Diana Radu
November 22–25: Portugal Junior & Cadet Open in  Guimarães

 Junior boys' singles:  Yanapong Panagitgun
 Junior girls' singles:  Lisa Lung
 Junior boys' doubles:  Cristian Chirita &  Yanapong Panagitgun
 Junior girls' doubles:  Mahshid Ashtari & Fatemeh Jamalifar

 Cadet boys' singles:  Yuma Tanigaki
 Cadet girls' singles:  Elena Zaharia
 Cadet boys' doubles:  Dragos Alexandru Bujor & Radu Andrei Miron
 Cadet girls' doubles:  Luciana Mitrofan & Elena Zaharia

Finals

February 2–4, 2018: 2017 ITTF World Junior Circuit Finals in  Luxembourg City

Table tennis at multi-sport events

 May 17–22: 2017 Islamic Solidarity Games in  Baku
 Men's singles:   Noshad Alamian;   Nima Alamian;   Li Ping
 Women's singles:   Melek Hu;   Zhing Ning;   Miao Wang
 Men's team:  ;  ;  
 Women's team:  ;  ;  
 June 24–30: 2017 Island Games in  Gotland
 Men's singles:   Björn Axelsson;   Ivik Nielsen;   Garry Dodd;   Nisse Lundberg
 Women's singles:   Marina Donner;   Henrietta Nielsen;   Dawn Morgan;   Evelina Carlsson
 Men's doubles:   Ivik Nielsen & Aqqalu Nielsen;   Garry Dodd & Joshua Stacey;   Joshua Band & Jordan Wykes;   Niklas Ahlgren & Max Hedbom
 Women's doubles:   Durita Fríðadóttir Jensen & Henrietta Nielsen;   Annika Ahlgren & Lina Olofsson;   Evelina Carlsson & Elin Schwartz;   Charlotte Casey & Daisy Kershaw
 Mixed doubles:   Marina Donner & Johan Pettersson;   Björn Axelsson & Evelina Carlsson;   Kelsey le Maistre & Jordan Wykes;   Garry Dodd & Dawn Morgan
 team:  ;  ;  ;  
 August 19–31: 2017 Southeast Asian Games in  Kuala Lumpur
 Men's singles:   Gao Ning;   Clarence Chew-Zhe Yu;   Padasak Tanviriyavechakul;   Richard Gonzales
 Women's singles:   Feng Tianwei;   Zhou Yihan;   Nanthana Komwong;   Suthasini Sawettabut
 Men's doubles:   Gao Ning & Pang Xue Jie;   Clarence Chew-Zhe Yu & Ethan Poh-Shao Feng;   Ficky Supit Santoso & M. Bima Abdi Negara;   Padasak Tanviriyavechakul & Supanut Wisutmaythangkoon
 Women's doubles:   Feng Tianwei & Yu Mengyu;   Lin Ye & Zhou Yihan;   Gustin Dwijayanti & Lilis Indriani;   Mai Hoàng Mỹ Trang & Nguyễn Thị Nga
 Mixed doubles:   Padasak Tanviriyavechakul & Suthasini Sawettabut;   Pang Xue Jie & Yu Mengyu;   Clarence Chew-Zhe Yu & Zhou Yihan;   Đinh Quang Linh & Mai Hoàng Mỹ Trang
 Men's team:  ;  ;  ;  
 Women's team:  ;  ;  ;  
 August 22–29: 2017 Summer Universiade in  Taipei
 Men's singles:   Masataka Morizono;   Chen Chien-an;   Pak Sin-hyok;   Alexandre Robinot
 Women's singles:   Jeon Ji-hee;   Cheng I-ching;   Kim Song-i;   Bernadette Szőcs
 Men's doubles:   Masataka Morizono & Yuya Oshima;   Jang Woo-jin & Lim Jong-hoon;   Chen Chien-an & Chiang Hung-chieh;   Lee Chia-sheng & Liao Cheng-ting
 Women's doubles:   Ayami Narumoto & Rei Yamamoto;   Cha Hyo-sim & Kim Nam-hae;   Minami Ando & Rika Suzuki;   Jeon Ji-hee & Lee Eun-hye
 Mixed doubles:   Jang Woo-jin & Jeon Ji-hee;   Kazuhiro Yoshimira & Minami Ando;   Liao Cheng-ting & Chen Szu-yu;   Pak Sin-hyok & Kim Nam-hae
 Men's team:  ;  ;  ;  
 Women's team:  ;  ;  ;  
 September 17–23: 2017 ASEAN Para Games in  Kuala Lumpur
  won the gold medal tally.  won the overall medal tally.

See also

International Table Tennis Federation
2017 in sports

References

External links
International Table Tennis Federation
European Table Tennis Union
Asian Table Tennis Union

 
Table tennis by year